Fritz Todt (4 September 1891 – 8 February 1942) was a German construction engineer and senior Nazi who rose from the position of Inspector General for German Roadways, in which he directed the construction of the German autobahns (Reichsautobahnen), to become the Reich Minister for Armaments and Ammunition. From that position, he directed the entire German wartime military economy.

Before the beginning of World War II, he initiated what Hitler called Organisation Todt, a military-engineering company that supplied industry with forced labour, built fortifications such as the Westwall and Atlantic Wall with that labour, and administered construction of the Nazi concentration camps in the late phase of Nazi Germany.

Todt died in an aircraft crash in 1942.

Early life and education 
Todt was born in Pforzheim in the Grand Duchy of Baden (now in Baden-Württemberg) to Emil Todt (1861–1909) and his wife, Elise, née Unterecker (1869–1935). His father owned a small ring factory.

In 1910, he volunteered for one-year military service. From 1911 to 1914, Todt studied engineering at Technical Hochschule of Munich and Karlsruhe, graduating with a Diplom degree in construction engineering from the latter.

During World War I, he served initially with the infantry and then as front line reconnaissance observer within the Luftstreitkräfte (the German Air Forces – DLSK), winning the Iron Cross. After the war he resumed his studies and graduated in 1920.

Career 
In 1921, he initially worked on waterpower stations for the Grün & Bilfinger AG, Mannheim company and the same year for the civil engineering company  where he worked until 1933. In January 1922, he joined the Nationalsozialistische Deutsche Arbeiterpartei (NSDAP), or Nazi Party. In 1931, he joined the Sturmabteilung (SA), which was then commanded by Ernst Röhm. He rose steadily through its ranks, attaining the rank of SA-Obergruppenführer in September 1938. In 1932, Todt completed his thesis at Technical Hochschule of Munich Fehlerquellen beim Bau von Landstraßendecken aus Teer und Asphalt ("Sources of defects in the construction of tarmac and asphalt road surfaces") and became a Doctor of Engineering (Dr.-Ing.).

On 5 July 1933, five months after Adolf Hitler became Reichskanzler, Todt was appointed Generalinspektor für das deutsche Straßenwesen (Inspector General for German Roadways). In November, this public authority was raised to the status of a "Supreme Reich Authority" (Oberste Reichsbehörde) outside the hierarchy of Reich Ministries; Todt was subordinated directly to Hitler. Alan S. Milward characterized this phase as follows:
"His personal views on business questions and, what was more important, the success of the motorway project kept Todt in the inner circle of the Führer. At the same time, his deliberate pose as a technical expert, as a man without interest in internal power struggles, saved him from the adversaries of the more important party leaders for a long time".
He was given the task of organizing a new construction company for the motorways (Reichsautobahnen). He edited the journal Die Strasse, which was a publication of his agency from 1934 to 1942. 
For his work on the autobahnen, Todt was recognized with the German National Prize for Art and Science by Hitler, next to Ernst Heinkel, Ferdinand Porsche and Willy Messerschmitt. Hitler donated the award during 1937, devised as a replacement for the Nobel Prize, which Hitler forbade Germans from accepting starting during 1936.

In December 1936, he became Leiter des Hauptamts für Technik in der Reichsleitung der NSDAP (Director of the Head Office for Engineering in the National Directorate of the NSDAP) and, in December 1938, Generalbevollmächtigter für die Regelung der Bauwirtschaft (General Plenipotentiary for the Regulation of the Construction Industry) in the Four Year Plan. At the beginning of World War II in Europe, he was also appointed to the rank of Generalmajor of the Luftwaffe. In May 1938, he initiated the Organisation Todt (OT), joining government firms, private companies and the Reichsarbeitsdienst (Reich Labour Service). OT used up to 800,000 forced labourers (Zwangsarbeiter) from countries that Germany occupied during World War II. Todt was responsible for the construction of the "West Wall" (commonly named the "Siegfried Line" in English-speaking countries) to defend the Reich territory.

On 17 March 1940, Todt was appointed Reichsminister für Bewaffnung und Munition (Minister for Armaments and Munitions) which meant he managed the entire military economy.

After the invasion of the Soviet Union in June 1941, Todt was appointed to manage the restoration of the infrastructure there. In late July 1941, he was named Generalinspekteur für Wasser und Energie (Inspector General for Water and Energy). During that year, he became increasingly distant from the commanders of the Wehrmacht, in particular from Reichsmarschall Hermann Göring, the Oberbefehlshaber der Luftwaffe (Commander-in-chief of the Luftwaffe). After an inspection tour of the Eastern Front, Todt complained to Hitler that without better equipment and supplies for the armed forces, it would be better to end the war against the Soviet Union. Hitler rejected such an assessment and continued the offensive against the Soviets.

Death 
On 8 February 1942, soon after take-off from the Wolfsschanze ("Wolf's Lair") airfield near Rastenburg, in East Prussia, Todt's aircraft crashed and he was killed. He was buried in the Invalids' Cemetery in the Scharnhorst-Strasse in Berlin. Posthumously, he became the first recipient of the newly created Deutscher Orden ("German Order").

It has been suggested that Todt had been the victim of an assassination orchestrated by Hitler, but that has never been confirmed. A possible motive for killing Todt was that he had flown to the Wolf's Lair to recommend that Hitler sue for peace with Russia. Todt's production figures suggested that the German economy was not able to support the defeat of Russia and, by February, it was apparent Hitler's plan to rapidly subdue Russia in a Blitzkrieg was not succeeding.

Todt's successor as Reichsminister was Albert Speer, whom Hitler awarded an Org.Todt ring during May 1943. Speer was supposed to be on same plane as Todt. In his autobiography, Speer mentioned a Reich Air Ministry inquiry into the airplane accident, which he said ended with the sentence: "The possibility of sabotage is ruled out. Further measures are therefore neither requisite nor intended". Speer, who was present but had declined to travel on the same flight because he had been kept up late the night before, talking with Hitler, thought that the wording was "curious".

Legacy

On 8 February 1944, the second commemoration of Todt's death, Hitler awarded the Dr.-Fritz-Todt-Preis as a Badge of Honor of the Nazi Party for "Innovative accomplishments, which are of great importance for the Volk community because of the improvement of their weapons, ammunition and military equipment, and the saving of labor, raw materials and energy". The Badge of Honor came with a material prize and a certificate, was awarded as a medal made of gold, silver, or steel. The Golden Award of Honor was presented by Hitler in person upon proposal by the responsible Gauleiter, upon the joint proposal of Robert Ley, the director of the corresponding Deutsche Arbeitsfront and NSDAP leaders, and the director of the "Main office for Technology in the NSDAP", Albert Speer.

Major awards
 1918 Iron Cross
 1937 Werner von Siemens Ring
 1938 German National Prize for Art and Science 
 1939 Grand Cross of the Order of the Crown of Italy
 1942 German Order

See also 

 Economy of Nazi Germany
 Forced labour under German rule during World War II
 Nazi architecture

References

Further reading
 , Rolf-Dieter Muller, and Hans Umbreit, eds. Germany and the Second World War: Volume 5: Organization and Mobilization of the German Sphere of Power. Part I: Wartime Administration, Economy, and Manpower Resources, 1939-1941 Oxford University Press, (2000)

 Taylor, Blaine. Hitler's Engineers: Fritz Todt and Albert Speer-Master Builders of the Third Reich (Casemate Publishers, 2010)
 Busch, Andreas: Die Geschichte des Autobahnbaus in Deutschland bis 1945. Rockstuhl, Bad Langensalza 2002, .

 : Fritz Todt, der Mensch, der Ingenieur, der Nationalsozialist. Ein Bericht über Leben und Werk. Gerhard Stalling, Oldenburg 1943.
 , Eckhard Gruber: Mythos Reichsautobahn. 2. Auflage. Links, Berlin 2000, .
 Franz W. Seidler: Fritz Todt. Baumeister des Dritten Reiches. Ullstein, Frankfurt am Main/Berlin 1988, .419 pp. 
 Adam Tooze: Ökonomie der Zerstörung. Die Geschichte der Wirtschaft im Nationalsozialismus. Siedler, München 2006 (German 2007), . New edition: Schriftenreihe der Bundeszentrale für politische Bildung, vol. 663, . Wieder: Pantheon, München 2008, .

External links
 Tribute to Fritz Todt. Story RG-60.3910, Film ID: 2691. Deutsche Wochenschau, February 1942 (in German). Duration 8:35 min. Steven Spielberg Film and Video Archive, USHMM. Funeral of Fritz Todt at 01:05:12.
 

1891 births
1942 deaths
People from Pforzheim
People from the Grand Duchy of Baden
20th-century German architects
German civil engineers
Luftstreitkräfte personnel
Sturmabteilung officers
Holocaust perpetrators
Architects in the Nazi Party
Nazi Germany ministers
Nazi Party officials
Major generals of the Luftwaffe
Burials at the Invalids' Cemetery
Technical University of Munich alumni
Prussian Army personnel
Recipients of the Iron Cross (1914)
Recipients of the German Order (decoration)
Engineers from Baden-Württemberg
Victims of aviation accidents or incidents in 1942
Victims of aviation accidents or incidents in Poland
Werner von Siemens Ring laureates
German Army personnel of World War I